The women's high jump at the 2011 Asian Athletics Championships was held at the Kobe Universiade Memorial Stadium on 1 July.

Results

References
Results

2011 Asian Athletics Championships
High jump at the Asian Athletics Championships
2011 in women's athletics